Mitteilungen der deutschen Patentanwälte is a monthly intellectual property law journal published in German, since 1934. The publisher is the Chamber of German Patent Attorneys.

See also 
 List of intellectual property law journals

References

External links 
  Web page (maintained by Carl Heymanns Verlag)
 
 

1934 establishments in Germany
German intellectual property law
German-language magazines
German law journals
Monthly magazines published in Germany
German patent law
Law journals
Magazines established in 1934